Hyperolius cystocandicans is a species of frog in the family Hyperoliidae.
It is endemic to Kenya.
Its natural habitats are subtropical or tropical dry lowland grassland, freshwater marshes, intermittent freshwater marshes, arable land, pastureland, and ponds.
It is threatened by habitat loss.

References

Sources
 C. Michael Hogan. 2013. Hyperolius cystocandicans. J.African Amphibians. ed. B.Zimkus

cystocandicans
Endemic fauna of Kenya
Amphibians described in 1977
Taxonomy articles created by Polbot